Sarab-e Pardeh Chahi (also Romanized as Sarāb-e Pardeh Chāhī and Sarāb-e Pardeh Chāy; also known as Sarab Pardeh) is a village in Dehpir Rural District, in the Central District of Khorramabad County, Lorestan Province, Iran. At the 2006 census, its population was 549, in 118 families.

References 

Towns and villages in Khorramabad County